The first  United States occupation of the Dominican Republic lasted from 1916 to 1924. It was one of the many interventions in Latin America undertaken by the military forces of the United States in the 20th century. On May 13, 1916, Rear Admiral William B. Caperton forced the Dominican Republic's Secretary of War Desiderio Arias, who had seized power from President Juan Isidro Jimenes Pereyra, to leave Santo Domingo by threatening the city with naval bombardment. The Marines landed three days later and established effective control of the country within two months. The U.S. occupations of Haiti and the Dominican Republic led to clashes that killed 290 U.S. Marines, over 3,000 Haitians, and hundreds of Dominicans. Despite having much greater firepower, it took the U.S. Marines five years to suppress an insurgency in the eastern provinces of El Seibo and San Pedro de Macorís.

Invasion
The piecemeal invasion resulted in the United States Navy's occupation of all key positions in government and controlling the army and police. The first landing took place on May 5, 1916, when "two companies of marines landed from the USS Prairie at Santo Domingo." Their goal was to offer protection to the American legation and the American consulate and to occupy Fort San Geronimo. Within hours, these companies were reinforced with "seven additional companies." On May 6, American forces from the USS Castine landed to offer protection to the Haitian Legation, a country under a similar military occupation by the United States. Two days after the first landing, constitutional President Juan Isidro Jimenes resigned.

Admiral Caperton's forces occupied Santo Domingo on May 15, 1916. Colonel Joseph H. Pendleton's Marine units took the key port cities of Puerto Plata and Monte Cristi on the 1 June and enforced a blockade. The marines were able to occupy Monte Cristi without meeting any resistance. However, when the marines attacked Puerto Plata, they were met with resistance from about 500 pro-Arias Dominicans. Though they were under heavy fire, the marines persisted in attempting to enter the city, and sustained several casualties such as the death of Captain Herbert J. Hirschinger, who was the first marine killed in combat in the campaign. 

The first major engagement occurred on June 27, at Las Trencheras, two ridges, which had been fortified by the Dominicans and long thought to be invulnerable, since a Spanish army had been defeated there in 1864. There the Dominican troops had dug trenches on two hills, one behind the other, blocking the road to Santiago. The field guns of Captain Chandler Campbell's 13th Company, along with a machine gun platoon, took position on a hill commanding the enemy trenches and opened fire at 08:00 hours. Under the cover of this fire, the Marines launched a bayonet charge on the defenders' first line of defense, covered until the last possible moment by the artillery barrage. The Marines came under heavy but inaccurate rifle fire, which caused some casualties. The Dominican soldiers were forced to retreat to their trenches on the second hill. They rallied there briefly, then broke and had to retreat again as the American field guns resumed their shelling of the hill. Within 45 minutes from the opening artillery shots, the Marines had forced the Dominicans to fall back. During the battle, five Marines were killed and four were wounded, and five Dominicans were killed. This engagement set the pattern for most Marine contact with the Dominican forces. Marines overpowered Dominicans with modern artillery, machine guns, small-unit maneuver, and individual training and marksmanship.

The Marines encountered another entrenched rebel force at Guayacanas, where the rebels kept up single-shot fire against the automatic weapons of the Marines before the Marines drove them off, killing 27 Dominicans while the Marine Corps only death was Corporal George Fravee. 

Two days after the Battle of Guayacanas, on July 3 the Marines moved onto Arias' stronghold in Santiago de los Caballeros. However, "A military encounter was avoided when Arias arrived at an agreement with Capteron to cease resistance." Three days after Arias left the country, the rest of the occupation forces landed and took control of the country within two months, and on the 29 November the United States imposed a military government under Captain (later Rear Admiral) Harry Shepard Knapp, Commander of the Cruiser Force aboard his flagship, USS Olympia (which still exists today in Philadelphia, Pennsylvania, United States).

Dominican forces in San Francisco de Macoris refused to lay down their weapons and occupied a local fort. This was in direct violation of the terms imposed by the military government installed by the United States. A small squad of Marines that were close by were able to make their way inside the fort and surprise the defenders, securing it before any organized resistance could take place.

Occupation

Marines claimed to have restored order throughout most of the republic, with the exception of the eastern region, but resistance to the occupation from Dominicans continued widespread in both, direct and indirect forms in every place. The US occupation administration, however, measured its success through these standards: the country's budget was balanced, its debt was diminished, economic growth directed now toward the US; infrastructure projects produced new roads that allowed the movement of military personnel across all the country's regions for the first time in history; a professional military organization that took away the power from local elites and made soldiers more loyal to the national government, the Dominican Constabulary Guard, replaced the former partisan forces responsible for the civil war with groups under the control of US Marines. The Constabulary Guard, later known as the National Guard, would persecute and torture those who opposed the occupation.

With the United States occupation of Haiti to the west of the Dominican Republic, the United States Marines controlled all of Hispaniola "through censorship, intimidation, fear, and military force", according to Lorgia García Peña. Like Haiti, the finances of the Dominican Republic were controlled by National City Bank of New York, subsequently allowing American businesses to acquire Dominican properties to cultivate sugar. American corporations would then force Haitians to migrate to the Dominican Republic and work on sugar plantations in poor conditions. American culture also influenced Dominicans, with cockfighting being replaced with baseball as the "national pastime". In addition, some Afro-religious groups being banned by occupying forces resulted in a stigma being placed against practicing communities that has continued into the 21st century. Marines also spread white supremacist ideology throughout the nation based on Jim Crow laws existing in the United States.

Most Dominicans greatly resented the loss of their sovereignty to foreigners, few of whom spoke Spanish or displayed much real concern for the welfare of the republic. A guerrilla movement, known as the gavilleros, with leaders such as General Ramón Natera, enjoyed considerable support from the population in the eastern provinces of El Seibo and San Pedro de Macorís. Having knowledge of the local terrain, they fought from 1917 to 1921 against the United States occupation. Imprisoned guerillas were mistreated by US forces according to Congressional investigations. The fighting in the countryside ended in a stalemate, and the guerrillas agreed to a conditional surrender:

Among protestors to the occupation was the Junta Patriótica de Damas, a group of feminist writers. Rosa Smester Marrero was a Santiago-born educator typical of feminist resistance to the occupation, publishing articles in literary magazines. Smester refused to speak English as a form of civil resistance, claiming that if she spoke that language, the Americans would also have occupied her mind.

Withdrawal

Dominican migrants in Cuba began a successful campaign to denounce the US occupation while Latin American governments also protested. According to the United States Department of State, US Senate investigations "proved embarrassing" to the Wilson administration after Dominican witnesses argued that the government's actions violated international law, were against Wilson's Fourteen Points, and that occupying forces abused captives.

After World War I, public opinion in the United States began to run against the occupation. Warren G. Harding, who succeeded Wilson in March 1921, had campaigned against the occupations of both Haiti and the Dominican Republic. In June 1921, United States representatives presented a withdrawal proposal, known as the Harding Plan, which called for Dominican ratification of all acts of the military government, approval of a loan of $2.5 million USD for public works and other expenses, the acceptance of United States officers for the constabulary, or National Guard, and the holding of elections under United States supervision. Popular reaction to the plan was overwhelmingly negative. Moderate Dominican leaders, however, used the plan as the basis for further negotiations that resulted in an agreement between U.S. Secretary of State Charles Evans Hughes and Dominican Ambassador to the United States Francisco J. Peynado on June 30, 1922, allowing for the selection of a provisional president to rule until elections could be organized. 

Under the supervision of High Commissioner Sumner Welles, Juan Bautista Vicini Burgos assumed the provisional presidency on October 21, 1922. In the presidential election of March 15, 1924, Horacio Vásquez Lajara, an American ally who cooperated with the United States government, handily defeated Peynado. Vásquez's Alliance Party (Partido Alianza) also won a comfortable majority in both houses of Congress. With his inauguration on July 13, control of the republic returned to Dominican hands.

Aftermath
Despite the withdrawal, there were still concerns regarding the collection and application of the country's custom revenues. To address this problem, representatives of the United States and the Dominican Republic governments met at a convention and signed a treaty, on December 27, 1924, which gave the United States control over the country's custom revenues. In 1941, the treaty was officially repealed and control over the country's custom revenues was again returned to the government of the Dominican Republic. However this treaty created lasting resentment of the United States among the people of the Dominican Republic.

According to Lorgia García Peña, the occupation resulted in increased inequality in the Dominican Republic and contributed 
to the establishment of an economic and political system that benefits rich companies, while subjecting most Dominicans to poverty. American support for future dictator Rafael Trujillo, who rose through the ranks of the National Guard with the help of the US Marines, was instrumental for establishing his base of support within the Dominican armed forces.

The Dominican Campaign Medal was an authorized U.S. service medal for those military members who had participated in the conflict.

See also
 United States occupation of the Dominican Republic (1965–66)
 United States occupation of Nicaragua
 Mexican Border War (1910–1919)
 Latin America–United States relations
 Foreign interventions by the United States
 United States involvement in regime change

References

External links
 
 About.Com: The US Occupation of the Dominican Republic, 1916-1924
 globalsecurity.org:Dominican Republic Occupation (1916-24)
 Country Studies: Occupation by the United States, 1916-24
 The American War Library: Numbers of Americans Killed/Wounded, by Action
Links in Spanish
 Educando: Causas y consecuencias de la invasión norteamericana de 1965 en la República Dominicana
 Hoy: La intervención militar norteamericana de 1965

History of the Dominican Republic
20th century in the Dominican Republic
1916 establishments in the Dominican Republic
1924 disestablishments in the Dominican Republic
1910s in the United States
1920s in the United States
Banana Wars
Conflicts in 1916
Dominican Republic–United States military relations
Military history of the Dominican Republic
United States Marine Corps in the 20th century
Wars involving the Dominican Republic
Dominican Republic
American military occupations
United States involvement in regime change